German submarine U-715 was a Type VIIC U-boat of Nazi Germany's Kriegsmarine during World War II. The submarine was laid down on 28 March 1942 at the H. C. Stülcken Sohn yard at Hamburg, launched on 14 December 1942, and commissioned on 17 March 1943 under the command of Oberleutnant zur See Helmut Röttger.

Attached to 5th U-boat Flotilla based at Kiel, U-715 completed her training period on 31 May 1944 and was assigned to front-line service.

Design
German Type VIIC submarines were preceded by the shorter Type VIIB submarines. U-715 had a displacement of  when at the surface and  while submerged. She had two shafts and two  propellers.

U-715 was fitted with five  torpedo tubes (four fitted at the bow and one at the stern), fourteen torpedoes, one  SK C/35 naval gun, 220 rounds, and two twin  C/30 anti-aircraft guns. The boat had a complement of between forty-four and sixty.

Service history
On the first and final patrol, U-715 was spotted north-east of Faeroe on 13 June 1944 by Canso T of No. 162 Squadron RCAF and attacked with depth charges while snorkeling at periscope depth. Heavily damaged, the U-boat surfaced and returned fire, managing to down the Canadian aircraft before sinking in position . This was the first occasion when a submerged U-boat was detected and attacked. Of the crew of 52, only 16 survived.

References

Bibliography

External links

World War II submarines of Germany
German Type VIIC submarines
1942 ships
Ships built in Hamburg
U-boats commissioned in 1943
U-boats sunk in 1944
U-boats sunk by Canadian aircraft
U-boats sunk by depth charges
World War II shipwrecks in the Atlantic Ocean
Maritime incidents in June 1944